Barry Mungar (born November 4, 1961) is a Canadian former professional basketball player. Following his college career at St. Bonaventure, he went on to play professionally in Europe. He was a key member of the Canadian national team in the late 80's, appearing with the team in several major tournaments, including the 1988 Olympics in Seoul.

Basketball career
Born in Ottawa, Ontario, Mungar attended Highland Secondary School in Dundas, Ontario, in the late 1970's where he starred at basketball. In 1981, he joined St. Bonaventure but suffered a back injury early in the season and missed all but two games. During his final season with St. Bonaventure, he averaged 17.1 points and 8.0 rebounds and was named to the All-Atlantic 10 Conference First-Team. Following his college career, he was drafted in the fourth round of the 1986 NBA Draft, taken 82nd overall by the Washington Bullets. After not making it to the final roster, Mungar left for Europe where he played professionally in Italy.

National team career
Mungar participated with the Canadian national team at the 1986 FIBA World Championship, the 1987 Acropolis International Basketball Tournament, the 1988 Tournament of the Americas (FIBA AmeriCup) and in the 1988 Summer Olympics in Seoul.

Personal life
Following his basketball career, Mungar worked as a constable with the Hamilton Police.

His daughter, Reece Mungar, played college basketball for Northern Kentucky University and University of Guelph.

References

External links
Barry Munger Short Bio
College statistics at Sports Reference
Olympic statistics at Basketball Reference
St. Bonaventure Hall of Fame profile

1961 births
Living people
Basketball players at the 1988 Summer Olympics
Basketball players from Ottawa
Canadian expatriate basketball people in Italy
Canadian expatriate basketball people in the United States
Canadian men's basketball players
Olympic basketball players of Canada
St. Bonaventure Bonnies men's basketball players
Washington Bullets draft picks